Groton is a town in Grafton County, New Hampshire, United States. The population was 569 at the 2020 census.

History 
It was originally named "Cockermouth" in honor of Charles Wyndham, Baron Cockermouth and Earl of Egremont, who was Great Britain's Secretary of State for the Southern Department from 1761 to 1763. Due to non-settlement the land was regranted in 1766, then renewed in 1772. In 1796, one of the later grantees, Samuel Blood, succeeded in renaming the town after his hometown, Groton, Massachusetts.

Groton's surface is uneven, although farmers found the soil arable for growing corn and potatoes. A branch of the Baker River in the north, together with several small streams feeding Newfound Lake in the south, provided water power for mills. By 1859, when the population was 776, there were ten sawmills, two gristmills, and a shingle and clapboard manufacturer. Although not open to the public, the Palermo Mine in North Groton is noted for its minerals.

On August 4, 2009, Groton approved siting a wind farm in the town. The wind farm was built by Iberdrola Renewables.

Geography 
The Cockermouth River, a tributary of Newfound Lake, flows from west to east across the center of the town. Groton lies fully within the Merrimack River watershed.

Demographics 

As of the census of 2000, there were 456 people, 175 households, and 127 families residing in the town.  The population density was 11.2 people per square mile (4.3/km2).  There were 342 housing units at an average density of 8.4 per square mile (3.2/km2).  The racial makeup of the town was 97.81% White, 0.22% Native American, 0.88% Asian, and 1.10% from two or more races.

There were 175 households, out of which 30.3% had children under the age of 18 living with them, 65.1% were married couples living together, 2.9% had a single female head of household, and 27.4% were non-families. 21.1% of all households were made up of individuals, and 5.7% had someone living alone who was 65 years of age or older.  The average household size was 2.61 and the average family size was 2.98.

In the town, the population was spread out, with 25.9% under the age of 18, 6.6% from 18 to 24, 29.8% from 25 to 44, 26.3% from 45 to 64, and 11.4% who were 65 years of age or older.  The median age was 40 years. For every 100 females, there were 117.1 males.  For every 100 females age 18 and over, there were 113.9 males.

The median income for a household in the town was $37,083, and the median income for a family was $46,250. Males had a median income of $28,906 versus $25,417 for females. The per capita income for the town was $18,680.  About 6.7% of families and 6.7% of the population were below the poverty line, including 3.9% of those under age 18 and 22.0% of those age 65 or over.

Education
It is within the Newfound Area School District. The district's secondary schools are Newfound Memorial Middle School, and Newfound Regional High School in Bristol.

References

External links 

 
 New Hampshire Economic and Labor Market Information Bureau Profile

Towns in Grafton County, New Hampshire
Towns in New Hampshire